Tribal Tech was a progressive fusion band, originally formed in 1984 by guitarist Scott Henderson and bass player Gary Willis. From 1993 forward the band included Scott Kinsey on keyboard and Kirk Covington on drums, and released ten albums that stretched the borders between blues, jazz, and rock. The band dissolved following the release of 2000's Rocket Science, with the various members pursuing solo careers. However, they re-formed to release another album, X, in 2012. In 2014, Henderson and Willis decided to dissolve the band once again.

Personnel 
Members:
 Scott Henderson - guitar
 Gary Willis - bass
 Scott Kinsey - keyboards
 Kirk Covington - drums

Discography 
 Spears (1985)
 Dr. Hee (1987)
 Nomad (1990)
 Tribal Tech (1991)
 Illicit (1992)
 Face First (1993)
 Primal Tracks (compilation) (1994)
 Reality Check (1995)
 Thick (1999)
 Rocket Science (2000)
 X (2012)

References

External links 
 Scott Kinsey's website
 David Goldblatt's website
 Scott Henderson's website
 Gary Willis' website
 Drummerworld.com article on Kirk Covington
 Facebook Group - Tribal Tech Addicts
 Tribal Tech Live At Big Mama - Italy (2000) (Real Video)
2015 Scott Henderson Interview on Guitar.com

American jazz ensembles from California
Jazz fusion ensembles
Progressive rock musical groups from California
Jazz musicians from California